Claude Zilberberg (26 May 1938 – 12 October 2018), Docteur d'État, was a semiotician, former co-director of the Paris Intersemiotic Seminar.

Work 
For more than 20 years, Claude Zilberberg analysed the effects of applying tensive modelling (which he introduced, with Jacques Fontanille) as an overlay onto the foundation of Greimasian semiotic theory.

References

External links
 SignoSemio.com - Explanations and implementations of Semiotic Theories of  Zilberberg (in french and english)

1938 births
2018 deaths
Academics from Paris
Scientists from Paris